Vallipuram Nalliah was a Ceylon Tamil teacher, politician, Member of Parliament and government minister.

Early life and family
Nalliah's birth date is the subject of some dispute, with some sources giving 9 October 1909, and others 1 July 1909. He trained to be a teacher, and married Thangaratnam, daughter of Muttiah.

Career
Nalliah was principal of the Men's Training School in Attalichenai. He was a member of Batticaloa Urban Council.

Nalliah contested the 1943 by-election as a candidate in Trincomalee-Batticaloa and was elected to the State Council.

Nalliah contested the 1947 parliamentary election as an independent candidate in Kalkudah. He won the election and entered Parliament. He joined the United National Party led government and was rewarded by being made Parliamentary Secretary to the Minister of Health and Local Government. He was re-elected at the 1952 parliamentary election as a UNP candidate. He was briefly Minister of Post and Information in the new government.

Nalliah stood for re-election as an independent candidate at the 1956 parliamentary election but was defeated by A. H. Macan Markar. He was also unsuccessful at the March 1960 parliamentary election. He was the All Ceylon Tamil Congress' candidate in Kalkudah at the 1965 parliamentary election but was again defeated.

References

1909 births
All Ceylon Tamil Congress politicians
Local authority councillors of Sri Lanka
Members of the 1st Parliament of Ceylon
Members of the 2nd Parliament of Ceylon
Members of the 2nd State Council of Ceylon
Parliamentary secretaries of Ceylon
People from Batticaloa
People from British Ceylon
Posts ministers of Sri Lanka
Sri Lankan Tamil politicians
Sri Lankan Tamil teachers
United National Party politicians
Year of death missing